The Kost Farm Barn in Olivet, South Dakota is a Gothic-arch barn which was built in 1917.  It was listed on the National Register of Historic Places in 2003.

It is a two-story wood barn with clapboard siding, on a concrete foundation.  It has a gothic arch roof over its main section.  There is also a one-story lean-to section on the north side.

It was deemed notable as "an excellent example of the Gothic Arch Barn in South Dakota."

References

Gothic-arch barns
National Register of Historic Places in South Dakota
Buildings and structures completed in 1917
Hutchinson County, South Dakota